Nucleoporin-like 2 is a protein that in humans is encoded by the NUPL2 gene.

References

Further reading